Faremoutiers is a commune in the Seine-et-Marne department in the Île-de-France region in north-central France.

History
Originally named Evoriacum, Faremoutiers was renamed in honour of Saint Fara, who founded the Abbey of Faremoutiers there in the 620s. It lies in the historical region of Brie.

Demographics
Inhabitants of Faremoutiers are called Faremontais.

See also
Communes of the Seine-et-Marne department

References

External links

 Official site 
1999 Land Use, from IAURIF (Institute for Urban Planning and Development of the Paris-Île-de-France région) 

Communes of Seine-et-Marne